Kabbe North is an electoral constituency of the Zambezi Region of Namibia. As of 2020, the constituency had 3,916 registered voters. 

Kabbe North was created in August 2013 from the north-western part of Kabbe Constituency, following a recommendation of the Fourth Delimitation Commission of Namibia to split Kabbe, and in preparation of the 2014 general election.

Politics
The 2015 regional election was won by Peter Mwala of the SWAPO Party with 1,487 votes, followed by Calvin Ngandi Ngandi of the Rally for Democracy and Progress (RDP) with 63 votes. The 2020 regional election was also won by the SWAPO candidate. Bernard Kamwi Sisamu obtained 1,116 votes, ahead of Joseph Likando Matali from the Independent Patriots for Change (IPC), an opposition party formed in August 2020 with 292 votes, and Cooks Mukuwa Muyoba from the Popular Democratic Movement (PDM) with 136 votes.

See also
 Administrative divisions of Namibia

References

Constituencies of Zambezi Region
States and territories established in 2013
2013 establishments in Namibia